Carnkie is a village in west Cornwall, England, United Kingdom. It is situated half a mile west of Rame, approximately three and a half miles west of Penryn and approximately five miles north east of Helston. It is in the civil parish of Wendron.

The village has a village hall and a garage, and until 2010 also had a Methodist chapel.

The name Carnkie comes from the Cornish language words karn, meaning 'crag, tor', and ki, meaning 'dog'.

The chapel

The old chapel at Carnkie was built in 1900 as a Bible Christian Chapel. The chapel was closed in 2010 and the last service was held on 22 August.

References

Villages in Cornwall